Neha Shetty is an Indian actress and model who primarily appears in Telugu films. Shetty made her debut with the Kannada film Mungaru Male 2 in 2016, and went on to star in Telugu films such as Mehbooba, Gully Rowdy and DJ Tillu.

Early life 
Neha Shetty was born in Mangalore, Karnataka and brought up in Bangalore. Her mother is a dentist while her father is a businessman, and she has a younger sister.

Career 
Shetty began her career in modelling and won the Miss Mangalore beauty pageant in 2014, and was the runner up of Miss South India 2015. Shashank cast her in the Kannada film Mungaru Male 2 after an extensive search. Though the film garnered mixed reviews, Shetty's performance was appreciated. Shyam Prasad S of Bangalore Mirror stated that she made a promising start to her career.

Later, she was cast in the Puri Jagannadh-directed Telugu film Mehbooba (2018). Shetty was not familiar with Telugu before but learned the language for the film. Firstpost critic Hemanth Kumar felt that the film did not offer Shetty which has scope for performance. Following Mehbooba, Shetty took a break of six months to pursue an acting course in New York Film Academy.

In 2021, she appeared in two films. She played a lead in Gully Rowdy, in addition to a small role in Most Eligible Bachelor. In 2022, she starred in DJ Tillu. Thadhagath Pathi of The Times of India wrote Shetty was "really impressive" in the film, and stole the show along with Siddhu Jonnalagadda. The Hindu critic Sangeetha Devi Dundoo opined that she pulled of a "complex character" well.She'll be next seen in Bedurulanka 2012 (2023 film)as Chitra.

Filmography

Film

Music video

References

External links 

 
 

Living people
1999 births
21st-century Indian actresses
Indian film actresses
Actresses in Kannada cinema
Actresses in Telugu cinema
Actresses from Mangalore
Female models from Bangalore
Actresses from Bangalore